Námestovo is a town in northern Slovakia. It is the capital and largest town of Námestovo District in the Žilina Region.  its population was 7,827.

Etymology
The name is derived from a word námesta (a representative, a deputy; like modern Slovak námestník or Czech náměstek) referring to a representative of Vlach settlers whose seat was in Námestovo. Alternatively, it could be derived from a personal name Namest (a less probable theory).

Geography

History
The town was mentioned in the 16th century, when the massive colonisation of Orava took place. It was growing quickly, thanks to its favourable location on the trade route to Poland. The town was burned down at the end of World War II. The construction of the Orava reservoir affected the way of life in the town, as two-thirds of the town were inundated, including the town centre. Boom of the industry and the following apartment construction in the 1970s contributed to the growth of the town.

Demographics
According to the 2001 census, the town had 8,135 inhabitants. 98.65% of inhabitants were Slovaks and 0.65% Czechs. The religious makeup was 92.12% Roman Catholics, 4.95% people with no religious affiliation and 0.84% Lutherans.

Pictures

People 
 Jozef Kabaň
 Dušan Tittel
 Anton Bernolák

See also
Namestovo church

References

External links
The Town of Námestovo 

Cities and towns in Slovakia